Andy Vine is a Welsh-born Canadian folk musician from Vancouver.

Music
Andy's musical style is described as "maritime folk, old-time rock and Celtic". He released his first album "Making Waves" in 2005. One song from this album ("Woman of Labrador") was inspired by Elizabeth Goudie, a pioneer in Labrador, Canada and has been included in the Great Canadian Songbook. In 2007 Andy wrote "Excuse Me Your Planet Is Burning". Andy is now retired and living on Cortes Island, BC where he performs at local events. Many of his recordings can be heard on SoundCloud.

Family
Andy has two sons, Elgin and Simon, both fine musicians and a daughter, Michelle who sings and plays ukelele.

References

External links
 
 Great Canadian Songbook
 Andy Vine at CDBaby

1944 births
Living people
Musicians from Swansea
Canadian folk rock musicians
Canadian singer-songwriters
Musicians from Vancouver